Kuku may refer to:

People 
 Emir-Usein Kuku (born 1976), Crimean Tatar human rights defender
 Kuku people, an ethnic group in South Sudan
 Kuku Yulanji, an Aboriginal people of the Daintree region in North Queensland, Australia

Places 
Kuku, Algeria, a village in Tizi Ouzou Province, former capital of the Kingdom of Kuku
Kingdom of Kuku, a 16th–17th century Kabyle kingdom in Algeria
Kuku, Estonia, a village in Estonia
Kuku, Iran, a village in Kermanshah Province, Iran
Kükü, Azerbaijan

Radio
 KUKU (AM) (1330 AM), an defunct radio station in Willow Springs, Missouri, U.S.
 KUKU-FM (100.3 FM), a radio station in Willow Springs, Missouri, U.S.
 Radio Kuku in Estonia, established in 1992

Other 
 Kuku 3D, 1 2013 Slovak stereoscopic movie
 Kuku dialect, the language of the Kuku people
 Kuku (food), a Persian and Azerbaijani omelette
 Kuku (music),  the title of a traditional piece of music from the West African nations
 Perna canaliculus, a mussel also known as kuku
 Kuku, a South African slang word for the female genitalia

See also
 KooKoo, a 1981 album by Debbie Harry
 Cuckoo, a family of birds
 Koukou (disambiguation)
 KUKU (disambiguation)
 Kukus, German name of Kuks, a village in the Czech Republic
 Kukuš, a city in Central Macedonia, Greece